The following is a list of ambassadors of the United States to Ghana. The embassy in Accra was established March 6, 1957, with Donald W. Lamm in charge as chargé d'affaires. President Joe Biden nominated career US diplomat and Acting Assistant Secretary/Principal Deputy Assistant Secretary of the Bureau of Energy Resources Virginia E. Palmer for the position on June 2, 2021.

Ambassadors

See also
 Embassy of the United States, Accra

Notes

References
United States Department of State: Background notes on Ghana

Senior  Staff Of Travel Relations  Peter Asante Smith

External links
 United States Department of State: Chiefs of Mission for Ghana
 United States Department of State: Ghana
 United States Embassy in Accra

Ghana
United States Ambassadors